Workplace democracy is the application of democracy in various forms (examples include voting systems, debates,  democratic structuring, due process, adversarial process, systems of appeal) to the workplace. It can be implemented in a variety of ways, depending on the size, culture, and other variables of an organization.

Theory

Economic argument
From as early as the 1920s, scholars have been exploring the idea of increasing employee participation and involvement. They sought to learn whether including employees in organizational decision-making would lead to increased effectiveness and productivity within the organization. According to Lewin, individuals who are involved in decision-making also have increased openness to change. Different participative techniques can have either a stronger impact on morale than productivity, while others have the reverse effect. Success of the employee-owned and operated Mondragon suggests economic benefits from workplace democracy.

Citizenship argument
Workplace democracy acts as an agent to encourage public participation in a government's political process. Skills developed from democracy in the workplace can transfer to improved citizenship and result in a better functioning democracy. Workers in a democratic environment may also develop a greater concern from the common good, which also transfers to fundamental citizenship.

Ethical justification
Philosopher Robert Dahl claims that 'if democracy is justified in governing the state, it must also be justified in governing economic enterprises'. However, some political scientists have questioned whether the state-firm analogy is the most appropriate way to justify workplace democratization.

Employee power and representation
Workers working for democratic leaders report positive results such as group member satisfaction, friendliness, group mindedness, 'we' statements, worker motivation, creativity, and dedication to decisions made within an organization.

When workplace democracy is used the effect typically is raised employee potential, employee representation, higher autonomy, and equal power within an organization (Rolfsen, 2011).

Political association
Workplace democracy theory closely follows political democracy, especially in larger workplaces. Democratic workplace organization is often associated with trade unions, anarchist, and socialist (especially libertarian socialist) movements. Most unions have democratic structures at least for selecting the leader, and sometimes these are seen as providing the only democratic aspects to the workplace. However, not every workplace that lacks a union lacks democracy, and not every workplace that has a union necessarily has a democratic way to resolve disputes 

Historically, some unions have been more committed to workplace democracy than others. The Industrial Workers of the World pioneered the archetypal workplace democracy model, the Wobbly Shop, in which recallable delegates were elected by workers, and other norms of grassroots democracy were applied. This is still used in some organizations, notably Semco and in the software industry.

Spanish anarchists, Mohandas Gandhi's Swadeshi movement, and farm and retail co-operative movements, all made contributions to the theory and practice of workplace democracy and often carried that into the political arena as a "more participatory democracy." The Green parties worldwide have adopted workplace democracy as a central platform, and also often mimic workplace democracy norms such as gender equity, co-leadership, deliberative democracy applied to any major decision, and leaders who don't do policy. The democratic socialist parties have supported the notion of workplace democracy and democratically controlled institutions.

The best known and most studied example of a successfully democratic national labor union in the United States are the United Electrical, Radio and Machine Workers of America, known throughout the labor movement as the UE. An independent trade Union, the UE was built from the bottom-up, and takes pride in its motto that "The Members Run This Union!"

The Menshevik led Democratic Republic of Georgia experimented with workplace democracy by promoting cooperatives in the economy. These cooperatives were ended when Georgia was annexed into the Soviet Union.

In Sweden, the Swedish Social Democratic Party made laws and reforms from 1950-70 to establish more democratic workplaces.

Salvador Allende championed a large number of such experiments in Chile when he became president of Chile in 1970.

Current approaches

Limits on management

Many organizations began to realize by the 1960s that tight control by too few people was encouraging groupthink, increasing turnover in staff and a loss of morale among qualified people helpless to appeal what they saw as misguided, uninformed, or poorly thought-out decisions. Often employees who publicly criticize such poor decision making of their higher management are penalized or even fired from their jobs on some pretext or other. The comic strip Dilbert has become popular satirizing this type of oblivious management, iconically represented by the Pointy-haired Boss, a nameless and clueless social climber. The Dilbert principle has been accepted as fact by some.

Much management philosophy has focused on trying to limit manager power, differentiate leadership versus management, and so on. Henry Mintzberg, Peter Drucker and Donella Meadows were three very notable theorists addressing these concerns in the 1980s. Mintzberg and Drucker studied how executives spent their time, Meadows how change and leverage to resist it existed at all levels in all kinds of organizations.

Adhocracy, functional leadership models and reengineering were all attempts to detect and remove administrative incompetence. Business process and quality management methods in general remove managerial flexibility that is often perceived as masking managerial mistakes, but also preventing transparency and facilitating fraud, as in the case of Enron. Had managers been more accountable to employees, it is argued, owners and employees would not have been defrauded.

Equity model 
In the equity model, employees own voting shares of their company, most commonly through an employee stock ownership plan. The equity model of workplace democracy exists when bottom-up practices, such as participatory management, are combined with the top-down influence provided by their voting rights.

Codetermination 

German law specifically mandates democratic worker participation in the oversight of workplaces with 2000 or more employees. Similar laws exist in Denmark for businesses with more than 20 workers and France for businesses with more than 5000 workers.

Staff and Worker Representative Congresses 
In China, a form of workplace democracy is mandated by law for state-owned enterprises. This is done through Staff and Worker Representative Congresses (SWRCs), composed of workers directly elected by all workers in the workplace to represent them.

Examples of companies organized by workplace democracy

Mondragon
The Mondragon Cooperative Corporation is the largest worker cooperative in the world, and as such the largest corporation that operates some form of workplace democracy. The Marxian economist Richard D. Wolff states it is "a stunningly successful alternative to the capitalist organization of production".

Marland Mold
Marland Mold was a company started in 1946 in Pittsfield, Massachusetts, by Severino Marchetto and Paul Ferland. The company at first, designed and built steel molds for plastic products throughout the 1950s and 60s. In 1969 the owners sold the company to VCA which was later bought by The Ethyl Corporation. The Marland Mold employees voted to join the International Union of Electrical Workers, because of a dispute that took place over health insurance. The plant's manager started to pay less attention and put less time into the Pittsfield plant so the profits declined. The plant was put up for sale in 1992. The employees ended up buying out the plant, even though they weren't fans of employee ownership before, they needed to save their jobs. There immediately was a burst in production and they were able to produce molds that normally took the 3,000 hours to make in 2,200 hours. They had financial stake in the company now which gave them new motivation for the company's success. The other two ideas that were key components to their success was the education of all members about their new roles, and building an ownership culture within the organization. In 1995, they had officially bought all ownership stock and buyout lenders and the company was completely employee owned. Through all of this employees were also able to gain a broader perspective on the company, like being able to understand others views of different conflicts in the workplace. In 2007, Marland Mold celebrated their 15th anniversary of employee ownership.

In 2010, Marland Mold were acquired by Curtil. In 2017, the Pittsfield plant was shut.

Semco
In the 1980s, Brazilian businessman Ricardo Semler, converted his family firm, a light manufacturing concern called Semco, and transformed it into a strictly democratic establishment where managers were interviewed and then elected by workers. All managerial decisions were subject to democratic review, debate and vote, with the full participation of all workers. This radical approach to management got him and the company a great deal of attention. Semler argued that handing the company over to the workers was the only way to free time for himself to go build up the customer, government and other relationships required to make the company grow. By giving up the fight to hold any control of internals, Semler was able to focus on marketing, positioning, and offer his advice (as a paid, elected spokesman, though his position as major shareholder was not so negotiable) as if he were, effectively, an outside management consultant hired by the company. Decentralization of management functions, he claimed, gave him a combination of insider information and outsider credibility, plus the legitimacy of truly speaking for his workers in the same sense as an elected political leader.

Other companies 

 Brukman
 Egged (formerly)
 Evergreen Cooperatives
 FaSinPat
Flaskô (Portuguese Wikipedia)
 Hotel Bauen
 Indian Coffee House
 LIP
 Pascual Boing
 Sri Lanka Transport Board (formerly)
 Suma Wholefoods
 Tandanor shipyard
 The Meriden Motorcycle Co-operative
 W. L. Gore and Associates
 Zapatista coffee cooperatives

Research on workplace democracy

Management science studies
There are many management science papers on the application of democratic structuring to the workplace, and its benefits.

Benefits are often contrasted to simple command hierarchy arrangements in which "the boss" can hire anyone and fire anyone, and takes absolute and total responsibility for their own well-being and also all that occurs "under" them. The command hierarchy is a preferred management style followed in many companies for its simplicity, speed and low process overheads.

London Business School chief, Nigel Nicholson, in his 1998 Harvard Business Review paper: "How Hardwired is Human Behavior?" suggested that human nature was just as likely to cause problems in the workplace as in larger social and political settings, and that similar methods were required to deal with stressful situations and difficult problems. He held up the workplace democracy model advanced by Ricardo Semler as the "only" one that actually took cognizance of human foibles.

Influenced matrix management

Managerial grid models and matrix management, compromises between true workplace democracy and conventional top-down hierarchy, became common in the 1990s. These models cross responsibilities so that no one manager had total control of any one employee, or so that technical and marketing management were not subordinated to each other but had to argue out their concerns more mutually. A consequence of this was the rise of learning organization theory, in which the ontology of definitions in common among all factions or professions becomes the main management problem.

Effects on productivity 
A meta-analysis of 43 studies on worker participation found there was no negative correlation between workplace democracy and higher efficiency and productivity. A report looking at research on democratic workplaces in the USA, Europe and Latin America found workplace democracy had staff working 'better and smarter' with production organized more efficiently. They were also able to organize more efficiently on a larger scale and in more capital-intensive industries than hierarchical workplaces. A 1987 study of democratic workplaces in Italy, the UK and France found that workplace democracy has a positive relationship with productivity and that democratic firms do not get less productive as they get larger. A report on democratic workplaces in the USA found that they can increase worker incomes by 70-80%, that they can grow 2% faster a year than other businesses and have 9-19% greater levels of productivity, 45% lower turnover rates and are 30% less likely to fail in the first few years of operation. A 1995 study of workplace democracy in the timber industry in the Northwest United States found that productivity increased by 6 to 14% with workplace democracy. A 2006 meta-study on workplace democracy found that it can 'equal or exceed the productivity of conventional enterprises when employee involvement is combined with ownership' and 'enrich local social capital.'

Effects on business longevity 
According to an analysis, businesses with democratic workplaces in British Columbia, Alberta, and Quebec in the 2000s were almost half as likely as businesses with hierarchical workplaces to fail in ten years. According to an analysis of all businesses in Uruguay between 1997 - 2009, businesses with democratic workplaces have a 29% smaller chance of closure than other firms. In Italy, businesses with democratic workplaces that have been created by workers buying a business when it's facing a closure or put up to sale have a 3 year survival rate of 87%, compared to 48% of all Italian businesses. In 2005, 1% of German businesses failed but the statistic for businesses with democratic workplaces was less than 0.1%. A 2012 study of Spanish and French businesses with democratic workplaces found that they “have been more resilient than conventional enterprises during the economic crisis." In France, the three year survival rate of businesses with democratic workplaces is 80%-90%, compared to the 66% overall survival rate for all businesses. During the 2008 economic crisis, the number of workers in businesses with democratic workplaces in France increased by 4.2%, while employment in other businesses decreased by 0.7%.

Effects on Workers 
Overall, the effects on workplace democracy on workers seems to be positive. A 2018 study from South Korea found that workers had higher motivation in democratic workplaces. A 2014 study from Italy found that democratic workplaces were the only kind of workplace which increased trust between workers. A 2013 study from the United States found that democratic workplaces in the healthcare industry had significantly higher levels of job satisfaction. A 2011 study in France found that democratic workplaces “had a positive effect on workers’ job satisfaction.” A 2019 meta-study indicates that “the impact [of democratic workplaces] on the happiness workers is generally positive”. A 1995 study from the United States indicates that “employees who embrace an increased influence and participation in workplace decisions also reported greater job satisfaction”.

One 2012 study of three Italian towns of similar demographics, income, and geography found that towns with more democratic workplaces had:

 Better mental and physical health, and longer lives, with fewer strokes and heart attacks.
 Children were less likely to skip school and skipped school less.
 Less crime, including less domestic violence and greater feelings of safety among citizens.
 Higher rates of ‘social participation’ (joining clubs and charities; giving blood; voting).
 Perception of a more positive society, more supportive personal networks, and more trust in the government.

See also 

Aristocracy of labour
Deliberative democracy
Libertarian socialism
Popular assembly
Socialism
Syndicalism
Theory X and Theory Y
Worker cooperative
Workers' control
Workers' self-management

References

External links
Quotes and other writings on workplace democracy (Chomsky, Wheatley, et al.)
Articles by David Ellerman on workplace democracy
Workplace Democracy and Democratic Ownership—Richard Wolff & Gar Alperovitz at Left Forum, 2013.

Organizational behavior
Anti-capitalism
Socialism
Workplace
Democracy
Cooperatives
Types of democracy
Democratic socialism